Aaron Miller may refer to:

Aaron Miller (ice hockey) (born 1971), ice hockey player
Aaron E. Miller, American neurologist
Aaron David Miller (born 1949), American Middle East analyst and author
Aaron Miller (politician) (born 1987), member of the Michigan House of Representatives
Aaron Miller (baseball), pitcher